Ella Lola (2 September 1883 - ?)  was a vaudeville dancer at the end of the 19th century in America.

She was born in Boston and, besides her stage appearances, was filmed in short Kinetoscope productions such as Ella Lola, a la Trilby (1898) which was an example of Trilbyana.

References

External links
 Ella Lola, a la Trilby – the full Kinetoscope performance

1883 births
People from Boston
American female dancers
Dancers from Massachusetts
Vaudeville performers
Year of death missing